Jerzy Olesiak (18 January 1930 – October 2012) was a Polish bobsledder. He competed in the four-man event at the 1956 Winter Olympics.

References

1930 births
2012 deaths
Polish male bobsledders
Olympic bobsledders of Poland
Bobsledders at the 1956 Winter Olympics
Sportspeople from Nowy Sącz